Homage to Charles Parker is an album by American jazz trombonist/composer George Lewis recorded in 1979 for the Italian Black Saint label.

Reception

The AllMusic review by Michael G. Nastos states "Pretty stunning music. As heavy and stylistically different as this music is, the point is clear and well-taken. Lewis and his group make a statement unique in creative jazz and unto itself. This is an important recording in many ways, and a magnum opus for the leader".

Track listing
All compositions by George Lewis
 "Blues" - 17:42 
 "Homage to Charles Parker" - 17:55 
Recorded at Barigozzi Studio in Milano, Italy in 1979

Personnel
George Lewis - trombone, electronics
Douglas Ewart - bass clarinet, alto saxophone, cymbals
Anthony Davis - piano
Richard Teitelbaum - polymoog, multimoog and micromoog synthesizers

References

Black Saint/Soul Note albums
George E. Lewis albums
1979 albums